Dryope decrepita is a fly from the family Dryomyzidae. It has recently been placed in the genus Dryope, having been more widely known as Dryomyza decrepita.

Distribution
This is a Holarctic species, occurring in Canada and many northern states of the United States in the Nearctic realm, and very widespread in the Palearctic realm from the United Kingdom to Japan.

References

Dryomyzidae
Muscomorph flies of Europe
Diptera of Asia
Diptera of North America
Insects described in 1838